Klaus Alinani (born 3 March 2002) is an Albanian footballer who plays as a defender for Luftëtari in the Kategoria e Parë.

Career

Luftëtari
Alinani made his league debut for the club on 28 August 2019, coming on as a 78th-minute substitute for Aldrit Oshafi in a 1–0 home defeat to Partizani Tirana.

References

External links

2002 births
Living people
Luftëtari Gjirokastër players
Kategoria Superiore players
Albanian footballers
Association football defenders